Milnererpeton is an extinct genus of branchiosaurid temnospondyl amphibian from the Late Carboniferous of New Mexico. The genus was originally described in 1996 under the name Milneria, but since the name Milneria is preoccupied by a genus of mollusks, the name Milnererpeton was proposed as a replacement in 2002. The only species is Milnererpeton huberi.

References

Branchiosaurids
Carboniferous temnospondyls of North America
Fossil taxa described in 2002
Pennsylvanian genera 
Carboniferous geology of New Mexico
Prehistoric amphibian genera